Saint Thomas the Apostle is an Episcopal church in Hollywood, California.

History

Origins
St. Thomas Episcopal Church did not become an officially incorporated parish of the Episcopal Diocese of Los Angeles until August 1920. Its history really began in 1912, when Mary Ogden organized a church school in her living room with 10 people at the first meeting. Legend has it that the nascent congregation chose Saint Thomas the Apostle as its patron saint in 1913, when the bishop, after an investigation, "doubted" that there was a need for a mission in the far reaches of Los Angeles in Hollywood, where orange trees far outnumbered prospective parishioners. Undaunted, the handful of faithful chose the doubting apostle as their patron and applied again, successfully this time, for mission status in 1914.

On January 10, 1918, Bishop Joseph Horsfall Johnson appointed the Reverend A .F. Randall as priest-in-charge; church attendance rose to 37 on the following Sunday, and the next month the priest's salary was increased from $20 to $30 per month. By November 1919 a building fund (largely of Liberty Bonds and Thrift Certificates) had reached almost $1,600 and a lot on the corner of Sunset Boulevard and Sierra Bonita Avenue was purchased a simple frame building was erected.

Establishment as a parish and early years
A new campaign for parish status culminated on August 16, 1920, when the bishop established parish boundaries, articles of incorporation were approved by the State, and a seal was conferred. The Reverend Frank Roudenbush was called as the first rector, and the new parish was admitted to the convention of the diocese in 1921. In the same year the frame building was moved from Sunset Boulevard to the church's present location at Hollywood Boulevard and Gardner Street.

Upon the death of the first rector, the Reverend Arthur H. Wurtele was called in 1925 and proved to be the longest serving rector (so far) in parish history — until 1946. The parish prospered during his tenure, and in spite of the Great Depression construction began in August 1930 on the present Gothic Revival structure, designed by the architect Harold H. Martin (who also designed Trinity Church in Santa Barbara) — complete with a windowed clerestory and characteristically English hammer beams supporting the roof. The old frame church served as the parish hall until it was destroyed by fire in 1955. The present parish hall was built in the same year, during the tenure of the third rector, the Reverend George Barnes (1947–1958).

During the years of service of the fourth rector, the Reverend William B. Key (1958–1966), significant additions were made to the church structure. The chancel and bell tower included in the architect's drawings were never built, but in 1964 transepts were added to the nave and the sanctuary was enlarged, and in 1965 an east porch was added in place of the tower. The fifth rector, the Reverend Donald Ledsam, served for only four years and was succeeded in 1970 by the Reverend Canon Noble L. Owings. During his fifteen-year tenure the debt was retired and the mortgage burned (1971), and the east transept was dedicated as a Nativity chapel (now the Lady chapel), complete with an altar rail salvaged from the Diocese of Los Angeles' St. Paul's Cathedral after its demolition in 1980.

Change and growth at the end of the century
Upon the retirement of Canon Owings in 1985 it became apparent to some parishioners that the parish was at a crossroads, and a lengthy questionnaire was distributed on which respondents were asked to rank their priorities for the future. Although 63% of the respondents were single (including divorced), the "maintenance of a family atmosphere" was given the highest priority. Although the "welcome of newcomers" came in fourth, the suggestion that the parish "address the needs of the Gay Community in Hollywood and West Hollywood" came in dead last (52nd).

After the arrival in 1986 of the seventh rector, the Reverend Carroll C. Barbour, the parish went through a radical transformation. With new openness the parish grew remarkably: With an average membership of 400 adults, the vestry expanded from nine to twelve members in 1998. The relatively large number of adult confirmations indicated that many of the new members had come as lapsed adherents of other Protestant and Catholic communions, newcomers to the area, or from churches in which they felt no longer entirely welcome. The fact that the parish budget quadrupled in eight years made it possible to enlarge the clergy staff, to renovate and greatly enhance the church building and its furnishings, and to support the many services which Saint Thomas supplies to its members and the community.

Father Barbour was assisted by a number of associate pastors over the years. The last associate under Fr. Barbour was the Reverend Harold Anderson, from Saint Matthew's Parish in the Pacific Palisades.

Choir and organ
Under the direction of organist/choirmaster Jeffrey Parola, the choir is composed of unpaid volunteers who enhance not only the regular High Mass on Sunday, but also from time to time provided special services during the week—especially funerals—which have become less frequent during the AIDS retreat. In 1987 the parish began discussions about the renovation of the church's existing pipe organ. Under the direction of master organ builder, Weston Harris, and his associate, Thomas J. McDonough, the parish decided to commission a "cathedral-style" instrument. The quarter of a million dollar project featured, at its core, the historic Opus 46 of the Los Angeles Art Organ Company, built in 1904 for Christ Episcopal Church in downtown Los Angeles. It was later transplanted to the Church of the Open Door, where it was housed for 70 years. Mr. Harris discovered the instrument in storage, and Saint Thomas parish decided to return the organ to its Episcopalian origins. With this instrument at its core, the existing Saint Thomas organ was incorporated along with pipes from other locations including the Harvard University Memorial Chapel. The console shell was originally built for the Memorial Chapel at Stanford University by the E. M. Skinner Organ Company. The Saint Thomas organ features 72 ranks of pipes (4042 individual pipes), which combine to produce the definitive cathedral organ sound of the eclectic "American Classic" design.

Changes in the church building
During Father Barbour's time as rector, all three of the church altars were redone. A gift from a parishioner provided a carved-in-Italy colossal figure of the Ascending Christ, around which the distinguished liturgical artist Rhett Judice designed and executed a new reredos over the main altar. This was in the midst of the AIDS epidemic and it was felt a symbol of hope and resurrection was needed. Later Rhett Judice built a new reredos for the Lady chapel, also of his own design, and an altar and reredos for the Damien chapel in the east porch of the church, centering on the figure of Christ the King flanked by Saint Thomas the Apostle and Blessed Father Damien, the leper priest of Molokai. In 1998, Rhett completed the "East Wall" (liturgical east) and created the Stations of the Cross currently in use.

After the death from AIDS of assistant priest Robert Kettelhack in 1989, the chapel in the east porch was designated the Diocesan AIDS Memorial Chapel, with a painting by Ian Faulkner of Father Damien over the altar, and a specially-designed AIDS memorial book listing persons who have succumbed to the disease. When it was decided to build an AIDS chapel in the new cathedral center, Saint Thomas relinquished the furnishings. The altar is still used for the interment of remains. The chapel is now dedicated to Fr. Damien of Molokai. Fr. Damien is the 19th-century priest who worked among the lepers of Molokai and has been adopted as the patron of people with AIDS. Rhett Judice designed the triptych replacing the Falkner painting. A copy of the memorial book remains. This chapel also serves as the parish shrine for Our Lady of Walsingham. The rosary is recited there every Sunday morning.

The retirement of Fr. Barbour due to ill health in early 2000 was challenging event in the life of the parish. Barbour had been a strong and charismatic leader through a difficult time in the life of the parish. He helped to establish a strong Anglo-Catholic identity for the parish. It was with deep sadness in 2003 when the parish came together for his Requiem Mass.

21st century
In 2000, the Rev. Loren D. "Bud" Ruby was called to be the interim priest of the parish. Fr. Ruby came from Pennsylvania. His was the difficult task to guide the parish and help in the process of preparing for the next rector. During the two-year interregnum, Ruby gave of himself as a pastor, teacher, priest and friend. He encouraged and fostered lay participation and a shared sense of responsibility among priest and people.

A search committee was formed and a parish profile compiled and written. It was an exhausting process and required countless hours by vestry, wardens, and committees. These men and women served without complaint until finally four candidates were selected for the final choice. In December 2001, Father Ian Elliott Davies was called, by the vestry, to be the eighth rector of Saint Thomas the Apostle, Hollywood. He arrived in February 2002 and celebrated his first Mass on St. David's Day, March 1, the patron saint of Wales. It was appropriate to do so for Fr. Davies is a proud Welshman. Davies was the assistant priest at the famous Anglo-Catholic parish of All Saints, Margaret Street, London, England. Within a few months Fr. Mark Stuart came to the church, first as a parishioner but in a short time the rector called him to be the assistant priest. In 2004 the parish was able hire Stuart as full-time as associate rector. In 2010 he was appointed interim rector of St. Augustine by the Sea, Santa Monica, California.

Character of the parish
St. Thomas, as an Anglo-Catholic parish, believes in a social responsibility to the community. The church hosts a number of 12 step programs and provides facilities for meetings of neighbourhood groups. There are also service groups within the parish. One such prepares and serves lunch two days a month for the outpatients at the Rand Shrader Clinic at the County-USC Medical Center-for AIDS patients and the aged. Another committee serves breakfast for the homeless at the church, every second and fourth Saturday.

In addition to the ten Masses per week, parishioners sustain themselves physically and spiritually with social events, cultural activities, and devotional activities, such as the annual retreat-usually oversubscribed-to the Holy Cross monks at Mount Calvary or the sisters of the Holy Nativity at Saint Mary's Retreat House, both in Santa Barbara. There is St. Martin's Guild sponsoring social activities, the Garden Guild which cares for the grounds of the church. Parishioners participate as lectors, acolytes, ushers, in the altar guild, as choristers, and as extraordinary ministers of Holy Communion.

The adult Christian education functions throughout the year. It offers courses in church history and devotional practices. Confirmation classes are ongoing throughout the year. These are coupled with newcomer orientation classes.

In 2004 the two priests led a parish pilgrimage to Britain. The pilgrimage was centered on a visit to the Shrine of Our Lady of Walsingham. This pilgrimage led to the founding of a cell (Confraternity) of Our Lady Of Walsingham at St. Thomas. It is only the second such cell on the West Coast. Marian devotion is an important part of the spiritual life of the parish.

On the Feast of St. Thomas the Apostle on July 3, 2005, Bishop Sergio Carranza, with the assistance of Frs. Davies and Stuart, placed a primary relic of St. Thomas, the church's patron and protector, along with relics of Saints Barnabas and Matthias the Apostles, Ss. Mark and Luke Evangelists, Ss. Augustine of Hippo, Bonaventure, Thomas Aquinas, Gregory the Great, Jerome, Doctors of the Church, Ss. Ignatius of Loyola and Rafqua in the mensa of the high altar of the church.

During the last week of December 2011, the original reredos had been found and installed in the Lady chapel, and the current reredos has been moved to the physical east wall completing the Lady chapel and was announced at the Mass on January 1, 2012.

Rectors

Worship
The style of worship at Saint Thomas the Apostle Church is in the Anglo-Catholic or High Church tradition within the Episcopal Church that developed out of the early 19th-century Oxford Movement. Sunday services are Morning Prayer, Low Mass using the 1549 Book of Common Prayer, the rosary, Solemn High Mass, and Compline. Also featured is the Saturday Vigil Mass in Latin. Incense is used at most services, as well as Anglican choral music.

Organs and organists
The organ at Saint Thomas is one of southern California's premier concert organs. Its sixty-nine ranks of pipes, comprising over 3,800 individual pipes, are configured in the style known as the "American Classic". This design concept brings together a variety of organ tonal styles into one instrument, the transparent sound of the German baroque, the colorful inflections of the French classic and the majestic sounds of the English tradition. The American style is represented by instrumental sounds such as the orchestral flute, oboe, and clarinet.

This eclectic mix of styles was popularized in the 1940s and 1950s by the noted Aeolian-Skinner Organ Company of Boston and typifies America's most distinguished organs, such as those in the Cathedral of Saint John the Divine in New York City, Grace Cathedral in San Francisco, the Boston Symphony Hall, and the Salt Lake Tabernacle.  The tonal design of the instrument included alterations to the interior of the church building to improve its acoustical properties. This included the removal of carpeting, resurfacing the walls with a smooth finish, and applying a special lacquer to the ceiling. These modifications helped to create a resonant soundboard for both the organ and for choral music.

The Saint Thomas Organ was built from 1988 to 1990 by master organ builder Weston Harris, of West Hollywood, and Thomas J. McDonough, of Point Fermin. At the core of the organ is the historic Los Angeles Art Organ Company Opus #46. This instrument was built in 1904 for Christ Episcopal Church, located in downtown Los Angeles. The organ is one of the few surviving instruments built by the noted company, known for the organ built for the Louisiana Purchase Exposition of 1904, at the time the largest organ in the world. That instrument eventually became the core of the famous Wanamaker Organ in Philadelphia in 1915. The Church of the Open Door, a downtown Los Angeles landmark, acquired Opus #46 from Christ Episcopal Church and used it for seventy years, until its removal in April 1985.

Harris learned about the availability of the organ merely by accident. The instrument had been in storage since 1985 and needed to be sold and removed from the warehouse within a week. Only days later, the organ was purchased and its many thousands of components unloaded at Saint Thomas. With this organ as the core, carefully selected sets of pipes were added to complete the comprehensive tonal design. These pipes came from a variety of historic sources including the organ at Saint Stephen's Episcopal/Hollywood, Saint Athanasius/Echo Park, Saint Monica's Catholic Church/Santa Monica, the Memorial Church of Harvard University, and the former organ at Saint Thomas. The original builders of these additional pipes include Murray Harris, Aeolian-Skinner, Reuter, Pilcher, Stinkens, Giesecke, Gottfried, Whalley, Moller, Trivo, and Wicks. The console shell was built in 1924 by the Ernest M. Skinner Organ Company for the Memorial Chapel of Stanford University. The set of pipes named "Doppelflote" dates back to the 1890s.

Organ sounds are created by forced air blowing into different types of pipes. Most pipes are "flue" pipes and operate similarly to the way sound is produced by a policeman's whistle; no moving parts are involved. The metallic pipes seen mounted on top of the wooden boxes at either side of the altar are flue pipes. "Reed" pipes produce their sound when air passes by a thin brass reed causing it to vibrate and set up vibrations within the pipe. The tall, tapering pipes located in the west transept to the left of the altar are reed pipes as are the trumpet pipes extending out from the rear wall at the back of the church. Variations in pitch and tone are achieved through the shape, size, and materials used in each pipe as well as the amount of air pressure supplied to them. Most of the pipes in the Saint Thomas Organ are constructed of a various mixtures of lead and tin. Other pipes are made of wood, such as the large bass pipes located in the west transept.

Each pipe sits on top of a "windchest", which is basically an airtight box filled with compressed air supplied at a constant pressure by an air pump and air pressure regulators (bellows). Where each pipe connects to the windchest, there is a leather stopper which moves aside when the organist presses the appropriate key on the console. Air rushes into the pipe creating the sound.

The "stops" are the 141 knobs located on either side of the 4 keyboards in the console. They control which pipes are played when a key is depressed. The organist determines what mixing and coloring of sounds is desired and opens the stops in the appropriate combination. As many as 270 pipes can be made to sound with the pressing of only one key.

The design work for the Saint Thomas Organ included the selection of pipes to achieve the aforementioned American Classic tonal design, locating the pipes to fit best with the architecture and acoustics of the building, and laying out the wiring and compressed air systems. The majority of the pipes are located in large rooms behind the two sets of visible pipes at either side of the altar and behind the vertical louvres called "swell shutters". The shutters are used to blend sound volume and timbre. The organ chambers were already in place in the building, but required redesigning to accommodate the new organ. A separate soundproof room was added to house the  electric blower used to provide air to the pipes.

In addition to designing the organ, Harris and McDonough installed each pipe, all compressed air lines, and each windchest, restoring existing ones and constructing new ones, as required. Several miles of electrical wire were installed to connect each pipe valve to the relay system, which is operated by the stop controls on the console. Damaged pipes were repaired as needed. Finally, each pipe was "voiced", which is the fine tuning of volume, pitch, brilliance, speech, and other tonal characteristics.

Harris is both an organ builder and noted concert organist. His training as an organist included extensive study with Alexander Schreiner, former chief organist of the famed Salt Lake Tabernacle.  Harris has performed throughout Great Britain, Europe, and the United States. His organ-building apprenticeship was served with Wayne N. Devereaux, former chief organ technician of the Salt Lake Tabernacle organ. Harris' experience with the premier Aeolian-Skinner Organ, at the Salt Lake Tabernacle, is reflected in the design of the Saint Thomas Organ.

The elegant woodwork and decorative elements of the instrument were designed and crafted by Thomas J. McDonough. He studied architecture at the University of Minnesota, fine art and art history at Minneapolis College of Art and Design, and Gothic architecture in the cathedrals of northern France. His design and woodcrafting skills are evident in the decorative mahogany organ cases which support the visible pipes at either side of the altar as well as the decorative cases on either side of the door to the Memorial Chapel. All pieces were created to appear to be part of the church's original design.

Since late 2012, the organ has been undergoing extensive repairs and enhancements. This work on organ is being performed by the original organ builder, Mr. Harris, and is being funded by a Capital Campaign.  The organ is still operating while under repair.

In June, 2012, composer Jeffrey Parola was made organist/choirmaster at St. Thomas.

See also
 Anglicanism
 Anglo-Catholicism
 Christianity
 High Church
 Los Angeles
 Hollywood
 Churches

References

External links 
Saint Thomas the Apostle Hollywood

Episcopal church buildings in Los Angeles
Anglo-Catholic church buildings in the United States
Christian organizations established in 1920
Buildings and structures in Hollywood, Los Angeles